Wilshire/Vermont station is an underground rapid transit (known locally as a subway) station on the B Line and D Line of the Los Angeles Metro Rail system. The station is located near the intersection of Wilshire Boulevard and Vermont Avenue, after which the station is named, in the Los Angeles neighborhood of Koreatown. Unlike the other stations on Wilshire or Vermont which were built directly under the street, this station is offset on a diagonal between the two streets, allowing the lines to diverge without trains on one line having to slow for a tight turn. The station has a unique layout with two side platforms on two levels, necessitated by the flying junction between the lines just west of the station.

Service

Station layout

The station is located where the B Line and D Line converge on their way to Downtown Los Angeles. The station is designed with two platform levels: eastbound D and B Line trains (to Union Station) use the upper level, and westbound D (to Wilshire/Western) and northbound B (to North Hollywood) trains use the lower level.

At the time of its construction, it was the longest escalator in the United States west of the Mississippi River.

Hours and frequency

Connections 
, the following connections are available:
 LADOT DASH: Wilshire Center/Koreatown

Station artwork 
The artwork at the station depicts typographic letters and symbols designed by Bob Zoell. The letters on the pillars of the lower platform spell out "going by-by", what the B line and its patrons do when they zoom in and out of the station. Additional artwork at the station is the creation of Peter Shire.

Transit-oriented development

Above the station is the Wilshire Vermont Station mixed-use transit village development, a $136-million apartment and retail complex designed by the architecture firm Arquitectonica and developed by Urban Partners and MacFarlane Partners on land owned by the Los Angeles County Metropolitan Transportation Authority.  The development opened in 2007 and includes apartments, retail, and (as of 2009) an adjacent middle school. The property is managed by Greystar Real Estate Partners.

References

D Line (Los Angeles Metro) stations
B Line (Los Angeles Metro) stations
Koreatown, Los Angeles
Mid-Wilshire, Los Angeles
Wilshire Boulevard
Railway stations in the United States opened in 1996
1996 establishments in California